The Prince Charlie jacket is a formal black tie highland dress that was initially listed in tailor catalogs of the early 1920s as a coatee. Over the next couple of decades it became called a 'Prince Charlie' (PC). When introduced, it was marketed as an alternative to the regulation doublet and was to be worn with a black or white bow tie else white lace jabot as well as a tartan or red vest. It is a formal evening jacket and not suitable to be worn for day dress with a long tie.

It is a short cut jacket with short tails in the back. Embellished with scallop cuffs and silver buttons as well as silver buttons in the double breast style from the front, the back tails also have scallop flaps and silver buttons.

Gallery

Jackets
Scottish clothing